Yanoye (Yanoyé-Yenga or Yenga) is a village in Nana-Mambéré, Central African Republic.

Notes

Populated places in the Central African Republic
Populated places in Nana-Mambéré